Glenn McClanan (February 16, 1934 – January 26, 2012) was an American politician who served in the Virginia House of Delegates from 1972 to 1992.

He died on January 26, 2012, in Virginia Beach, Virginia at age 77.

References

1934 births
2012 deaths
Democratic Party members of the Virginia House of Delegates